Trichothecium is a genus of fungi with unknown place in classification.

The genus was first described by Johann Heinrich Friedrich Link in 1809.

The genus has cosmopolitan distribution.

Species:
 Trichothecium roseum

References

Hypocreales
Hypocreales genera
Hypocreales incertae sedis